Lewiczyn may refer to:

Lewiczyn, Grójec County, Poland
Lewiczyn, Mława County, Poland